The 2010 Judo Grand Prix Düsseldorf was held in Düsseldorf, Germany from 20 to 21 February 2010.

Medal summary

Men's events

Women's events

Source Results

Medal table

References

External links
 

2010 IJF World Tour
2010 Judo Grand Prix
Judo
Judo competitions in Germany
Judo
Judo